The Tokyo Sports Hai Nisai Stakes (Japanese 東京スポーツ杯2歳ステークス) is a Grade 2 horse race for two-year-old Thoroughbreds run in November over a distance of 1800 metres at Tokyo Racecourse.

The race was first run in 1986 and was promoted to Grade 3 status in 1996. It was run at Nakayama Racecourse in 2002. Past winners have included Bubble Gum Fellow, Nakayama Festa, Rose Kingdom, Deep Brillante, Isla Bonita, Satono Crown and Wagnerian. The race was elevated to Grade 2 class in 2021.

Winners since 2000

Earlier winners

 1986 - Sakura Rotary
 1987 - Kokusai Triple
 1988 - Sakura Hokuto O
 1989 - Asahi Pasion
 1990 - Sakura Yamato O
 1991 - Matikanetannhauser
 1992 - Surely Win
 1993 - Ines Souther
 1994 - Hokkai Rousseau
 1995 - Bubble Gum Fellow
 1996 - Godspeed
 1997 - King Halo
 1998 - Admire Cozzene
 1999 - Joten Brave

See also
 Horse racing in Japan
 List of Japanese flat horse races

References

Turf races in Japan